Chevrolet straight-6 engine may refer to:

 the  T-head engine used in the 1911–1913 Chevrolet Series C Classic Six
 the  L-head engine used in the 1914–1915 Chevrolet Light Six
 the Chevrolet Stovebolt engine series, introduced in 1929
 the Chevrolet Turbo-Thrift engine series, introduced in 1962

See also
List of GM engines#Inline-6